Ian Blyth (born 11 October 1942) is a British former swimmer. He competed in the men's 200 metre butterfly at the 1960 Summer Olympics. Swimming for Dundee Whitehall, he won the British Swimming Championships in 1960, competing in the 200 metres butterfly competition.

References

1942 births
Living people
British male swimmers
Olympic swimmers of Great Britain
Swimmers at the 1960 Summer Olympics
Sportspeople from Dundee
Male butterfly swimmers